The hanzi characters 白話字, transliterated báihuàzì in Mandarin Chinese and meaning vernacular script (literally white-speech-writing), also known as "Church Romanisation" can refer to the following romanisation systems:

 Peh-oe-ji (Hokkien)
 Phak-fa-su (Hakka)
 Phak-oa-chhi (Nanchang)
 Baeh-oe-tu (Hainanese)

See also 
 Bang-ua-ce, the similarly-named romanisation system for the Fuzhou dialect